The West Pittsburg Station is a former railway station that was constructed and used by the Pittsburgh and Lake Erie Railroad.  The station building is located just south of the city of New Castle, Pennsylvania in the small village of West Pittsburg.  The station is also located at the south end of the old Baltimore and Ohio Railroad New Castle Yard which is now used by CSX Transportation.  Major rail lines that pass the station into the yard include the New Castle Subdivision, the P&W Subdivision, and the Pittsburgh Subdivision.  The station is currently under restoration by the Beaver Lawrence Railway Historical Society which hopes to turn the structure into a museum.

External links 
Beaver Lawrence Railway Historical Society

Railway stations in Pennsylvania
Railway stations in the United States opened in 1907
Former Pittsburgh and Lake Erie Railroad stations
Transportation buildings and structures in Lawrence County, Pennsylvania
Proposed museums in the United States
1907 establishments in Pennsylvania